Podmosta is a genus of spring stoneflies in the family Nemouridae. There are about six described species in Podmosta.

Species
These six species belong to the genus Podmosta:
 Podmosta decepta (Frison, 1942)
 Podmosta delicatula (Claassen, 1923)
 Podmosta macdunnoughi (Ricker, 1947) (maritime forestfly)
 Podmosta obscura (Frison, 1936)
 Podmosta weberi (Ricker, 1952)
 † Podmosta attenuata Caruso & Wichard, 2010

References

Further reading

 
 

Nemouridae
Articles created by Qbugbot